Daniyal Gadzhiyev (born 20 February 1986 in Kizilyurt, Dagestan ASSR, Soviet Union) is a Kazakhstani born-Dagestani wrestler who competes for Republic of Kazakhstan. He won the bronze medal at the 2012 Summer Olympics in the Greco-Roman men's 84 kg event.

References

External links
 

1986 births
Living people
Olympic wrestlers of Kazakhstan
Wrestlers at the 2012 Summer Olympics
Olympic bronze medalists for Kazakhstan
Olympic medalists in wrestling
Kazakhstani people of Russian descent
Moscow State University alumni
Medalists at the 2012 Summer Olympics
People from Kizilyurt
Kazakhstani male sport wrestlers
21st-century Kazakhstani people